Čepno is a small village northwest of Gornja Košana in the Municipality of Pivka in the Inner Carniola region of Slovenia.

The local church, a small building on a hill above the settlement, is dedicated to the Holy Trinity and belongs to the Parish of Košana.

References

External links 

Čepno on Geopedia

Populated places in the Municipality of Pivka